The Montgomery Dam is a gravity dam on the Fox River in Montgomery, Illinois.  The dam was built for flood control and navigation in 1969 as a part of the Stratton project dam system which was designed to keep the river navagable from the Wisconsin border to the confluence with the Illinois River.   It is owned by Illinois Department Of Natural Resources.
 
It impounds . The Fox River watershed above the Montgomery Dam totals  .

For many years, this dam and the upstream North Avenue Dam set the water levels for the Aurora, Illinois stretch of the Fox River.  However, in 2006, the City of Aurora removed the North Avenue Dam, and advocates of a free-flowing river are now seeking removal of the Montgomery Dam as well.

References

Dams in Illinois
Geography of Aurora, Illinois
Buildings and structures in Kane County, Illinois
Dams completed in 1969
United States state-owned dams